This is a list of species of plants and animals protected by Appendix I of the Convention on International Trade in Endangered Species of Wild Fauna and Flora, commonly abbreviated as CITES.  There are no fungi listed in any appendix.

List of species protected by CITES Appendix II
List of species protected by CITES Appendix III

Appendix I

Abies guatemalensis
Abronia anzuetoi
Abronia campbelli
Abronia fimbriata
Abronia frosti
Abronia meledona
Acerodon jubatus
Aceros nipalensis
Achatinella spp.
Acinonyx jubatus (Annual export quotas for hunting trophies and live specimens granted as follows: Botswana: 5; Namibia: 150; Zimbabwe: 50)
Acipenser brevirostrum
Acipenser sturio
Acrantophis spp.
Addax nasomaculatus
Aerangis ellisii
Agave parviflora
Ailuropoda melanoleuca
Ailurus fulgens
Alligator sinensis
Aloe albida
Aloe albiflora
Aloe alfredii
Aloe bakeri
Aloe bellatula
Aloe calcairophila
Aloe compressa (Includes  vars. paucituberculata, rugosquamosa and schistophila)Aloe delphinensisAloe descoingsiiAloe fragilisAloe haworthioides (Includes Aloe haworthioides var. aurantiaca)Aloe helenaeAloe laeta (Includes Aloe laeta var. maniaensis)Aloe parallelifoliaAloe parvulaAloe pillansiiAloe polyphyllaAloe rauhiiAloe suzannaeAloe versicolorAloe vossiiAlouatta coibensisAlouatta palliataAlouatta pigraAltiphrynoides spp.Amazona arausiacaAmazona auropalliataAmazona barbadensisAmazona brasiliensisAmazona finschiAmazona guildingiiAmazona imperialisAmazona leucocephalaAmazona oratrixAmazona pretreiAmazona rhodocorythaAmazona tucumanaAmazona versicolorAmazona vinaceaAmazona viridigenalisAmazona vittataAmietophrynus channingiAmietophrynus superciliarisAnas aucklandicaAnas chlorotisAnas laysanensisAnas nesiotisAndrias spp.Anodorhynchus spp.Antilocapra americana (Only the population of Mexico; other populations are not included in the Appendices)Aonyx capensis microdon (Only the populations of Cameroon and Nigeria; all other populations are included in Appendix II)Apalone spinifera atraAquila adalbertiAquila heliacaAra ambiguusAra glaucogularisAra macaoAra militarisAra rubrogenysAraucaria araucanaArctophoca townsendiArdeotis nigricepsAriocarpus spp.Asarcornis scutulataAstrochelys radiataAstrochelys yniphoraAstrophytum asteriasAteles geoffroyi frontatusAteles geoffroyi ornatusAtelopus zetekiAtrichornis clamosusAxis calamianensisAxis kuhliiAxis porcinus annamiticusAztekium ritteriBabyrousa babyrussaBabyrousa bolabatuensisBabyrousa celebensisBabyrousa togeanensisBalaena mysticetusBalaenoptera acutorostrata (Except the population of Kitaa, which is included in Appendix II)Balaenoptera bonaerensisBalaenoptera borealisBalaenoptera edeniBalaenoptera musculusBalaenoptera omuraiBalaenoptera physalusBalmea stormiaeBatagur affinisBatagur baskaBerardius spp.Bettongia spp.Blastocerus dichotomusBoa constrictor occidentalisBolyeria multocarinataBos gaurus (Excludes the domesticated form Bos frontalis)Bos mutus (Excludes the domesticated form Bos grunniens)Bos sauveliBrachylophus spp.Brachyteles arachnoidesBrachyteles hypoxanthusBranta canadensis leucopareiaBranta sandvicensisBrookesia perarmataBubalus depressicornisBubalus mindorensisBubalus quarlesiBuceros bicornisCacajao spp.Cacatua goffinianaCacatua haematuropygiaCacatua moluccensisCacatua sulphureaCaiman crocodilus apaporiensisCaiman latirostris (Except the population of Argentina, which is included in Appendix II)Callimico goeldiiCallithrix auritaCallithrix flavicepsCaloenas nicobaricaCamelus ferus (Excludes the domesticated form Camelus bactrianus)Canis lupus (Only the populations of Bhutan, India, Nepal and Pakistan; all other populations are included in Appendix II.  Excludes the domesticated form, Canis lupus familiaris, and the dingo, Canis lupus dingoCaperea marginataCapra falconeriCapricornis milneedwardsiiCapricornis rubidusCapricornis sumatraensisCapricornis tharCaprolagus hispidusCaracal caracal (Only the population of Asia; all other populations are included in Appendix II)Carduelis cucullataCasarea dussumieriCatagonus wagneriCatopuma temminckiiCatreus wallichiiCephalophus jentinkiCeratozamia spp.Cercocebus galeritusCercopithecus dianaCercopithecus rolowayCervus elaphus hanglu – Remains listed in Appendix I under this name, but now classified as C. hanglu hangluChasmistes cujusCheirogaleidae spp.Cheloniidae spp.Chelonoidis nigerChinchilla spp. (Specimens of the domesticated form are not subject to the provisions of the Convention)Chiropotes albinasusChitra chitraChitra vandijkiChlamydotis macqueeniiChlamydotis undulataChondrohierax uncinatus wilsoniiCiconia boycianaCnemaspis psychedelicaColinus virginianus ridgwayiConradilla caelataCoryphantha werdermanniiCotinga maculataCrax blumenbachiiCrocodylus acutus (Except the population of the Integrated Management District of Mangroves of the Bay of Cispata, Tinajones, La Balsa and surrounding areas, Córdoba Department, and the population of Cuba, which are included in Appendix II)Crocodylus cataphractus – now reclassified as the genus Mecistops, with two species; remains in Appendix I as C. cataphractusCrocodylus intermediusCrocodylus mindorensisCrocodylus moreletii (Except the population of Belize, which is included in Appendix II with a zero quota for wild specimens traded for commercial purposes, and the population of Mexico, which is included in Appendix II)Crocodylus niloticus (Except the populations of Botswana, Egypt (subject to a zero quota for wild specimens traded for commercial purposes), Ethiopia, Kenya, Madagascar, Malawi, Mozambique, Namibia, South Africa, Uganda, the Tanzania (subject to an annual export quota of no more than 1,600 wild specimens including hunting trophies, in addition to ranched specimens), Zambia and Zimbabwe, which are included in Appendix II)Crocodylus palustrisCrocodylus porosus (Except the populations of Australia, Indonesia, Malaysia (wild harvest restricted to the Sarawak and a zero quota for wild specimens for the other States of Malaysia (Sabah and Peninsular Malaysia), with no change in the zero quota unless approved by the Parties) and Papua New Guinea, which are included in Appendix II)Crocodylus rhombiferCrocodylus siamensisCrossoptilon crossoptilonCrossoptilon mantchuricumCyanopsitta spixiiCyanoramphus cookiiCyanoramphus forbesiCyanoramphus novaezelandiaeCyanoramphus saissetiCycas beddomeiCyclopsitta diophthalma coxeniCyclura spp.Cynomys mexicanusDalbergia nigraDama dama mesopotamicaDasyornis broadbenti litoralisDasyornis longirostrisDaubentonia madagascariensisDendrobium cruentumDermochelys coriaceaDiscocactus spp.Dromus dromasDryocopus javensis richardsiDucula mindorensisDugong dugonDypsis decipiensEchinocereus ferreirianus ssp. lindsayiEchinocereus schmolliiElephas maximusEncephalartos spp.Enhydra lutris nereisEos histrioEpicrates inornatusEpicrates monensisEpicrates subflavusEpioblasma curtisiEpioblasma florentinaEpioblasma sampsoniiEpioblasma sulcata perobliquaEpioblasma torulosa gubernaculumEpioblasma torulosa torulosaEpioblasma turgidulaEpioblasma walkeriEquus africanus (Excludes the domesticated form Equus asinus)Equus grevyiEquus hemionus hemionusEquus hemionus khurEquus przewalskiiEschrichtius robustusEscobaria minimaEscobaria sneediiEubalaena spp.Eunymphicus cornutusEuphorbia ambovombensisEuphorbia cap-saintemariensisEuphorbia cremersii (Includes the forma viridifolia and the var. rakotozafyi)
Euphorbia cylindrifolia (Includes Euphorbia cylindrifolia ssp. tuberifera)
Euphorbia decaryi (Includes the vars. ampanihyensis, robinsonii and spirosticha)
Euphorbia francoisii
Euphorbia moratii (Includes the vars. antsingiensis, bemarahensis and multiflora)
Euphorbia parvicyathophora
Euphorbia quartziticola
Euphorbia tulearensis
Falco araeus
Falco jugger
Falco newtoni (Only the population of Seychelles)
Falco pelegrinoides – Remains listed in Appendix I, but now classified as F. peregrinus pelegrinoides
Falco peregrinus
Falco punctatus
Falco rusticolus
Felis nigripes
Fitzroya cupressoides
Fouquieria fasciculata
Fouquieria purpusii
Fregata andrewsi
Fusconaia cuneolus
Fusconaia edgariana
Gallirallus sylvestris
Gallotia simonyi
Gavialis gangeticus
Gazella cuvieri
Gazella leptoceros
Geochelone platynota
Geoclemys hamiltonii
Geronticus eremita
Glaucis dohrnii
Glyptemys muhlenbergii
Gopherus flavomarginatus
Gorilla beringei
Gorilla gorilla
Grus americana
Grus canadensis nesiotes – Remains in Appendix I under this name, but now classified as Antigone canadensis nesiotes
Grus canadensis pulla – Remains in Appendix I under this name, but now classified as Antigone canadensis pulla
Grus japonensis
Grus leucogeranus – Remains in Appendix I under this name, but now classified as Leucogeranus leucogeranus
Grus monacha
Grus nigricollis
Grus vipio – Remains in Appendix I under this name, but now classified as Antigone vipio
Guarouba guarouba
Gymnogyps californianus
Haliaeetus albicilla
Harpia harpyja
Helarctos malayanus
Heloderma horridum charlesbogerti – Remains in Appendix I under this name, but now classified as H. charlesbogerti
Heteroglaux blewitti
Hippocamelus spp.
Hippotragus niger variani
Houbaropsis bengalensis
Hylobatidae spp.
Hyperoodon spp.
Incilius periglenes
Indriidae spp.
Jabiru mycteria
Laelia jongheana
Laelia lobata
Lagorchestes hirsutus
Lagostrophus fasciatus
Lampsilis higginsii
Lampsilis orbiculata orbiculata
Lampsilis satur
Lampsilis virescens
Larus relictus
Lasiorhinus krefftii
Latimeria spp.
Lemuridae spp.
Leontopithecus spp.
Leopardus geoffroyi
Leopardus jacobitus – Remains in Appendix I under this name, but now classified as L. jacobita
Leopardus pardalis
Leopardus tigrinus
Leopardus wiedii
Lepilemuridae spp.
Leporillus conditor
Leucopsar rothschildi
Lipotes vexillifer
Lontra felina
Lontra longicaudis
Lontra provocax
Lophophorus impejanus
Lophophorus lhuysii
Lophophorus sclateri
Lophura edwardsi
Lophura swinhoii
Loxodonta africana (Except the populations of Botswana, Namibia, South Africa and Zimbabwe, which are included in Appendix II subject to annotation 2) – L. africana now refers exclusively to the African bush elephant; the African forest elephant, which remains listed in Appendix I as part of L. africana, is now classified as L. cyclotis
Lutra lutra
Lutra nippon
Lygodactylus williamsi
Lynx pardinus
Macaca silenus
Macaca sylvanus
Macrocephalon maleo
Macrotis lagotis
Mammillaria pectinifera (includes Mammillaria pectinifera ssp. solisioides)
Mandrillus leucophaeus
Mandrillus sphinx
Manis crassicaudata
Manis culionensis
Manis gigantea
Manis javanica
Manis pentadactyla
Manis temminckii
Manis tetradactyla
Manis tricuspis
Megaptera novaeangliae
Melanochelys tricarinata
Melanosuchus niger (Except the population of Brazil, which is included in Appendix II, and the population of Ecuador, which is included in Appendix II and is subject to a zero annual export quota until an annual export quota has been approved by the CITES Secretariat and the IUCN/SSC Crocodile Specialist Group)
Melocactus conoideus
Melocactus deinacanthus
Melocactus glaucescens
Melocactus paucispinus
Melursus ursinus
Microcycas calocoma
Mimizuku gurneyi
Mitu mitu
Monachus spp.
Morenia ocellata
Moschus spp. (Only the populations of Afghanistan, Bhutan, India, Myanmar, Nepal and Pakistan; all other populations are included in Appendix II)
Muntiacus crinifrons
Muntiacus vuquangensis
Mustela nigripes
Mycteria cinerea
Naemorhedus baileyi
Naemorhedus caudatus
Naemorhedus goral
Naemorhedus griseus
Nanger dama
Nasalis larvatus
Nectophrynoides spp.
Neofelis nebulosa
Neophema chrysogaster
Neophocaena asiaeorientalis
Neophocaena phocaenoides
Nepenthes khasiana
Nepenthes rajah
Neurergus kaiseri
Nilssonia gangetica
Nilssonia hurum
Nilssonia nigricans
Nimbaphrynoides spp.
Ninox natalis
Nipponia nippon
Numenius borealis
Numenius tenuirostris
Nycticebus spp.
Obregonia denegrii
Ognorhynchus icterotis
Onychogalea fraenata
Orcaella brevirostris
Orcaella heinsohni
Oreonax flavicauda
Oreophasis derbianus
Ornithoptera alexandrae
Oryx dammah
Oryx leucoryx
Osteolaemus tetraspis
Ovis ammon hodgsonii
Ovis ammon nigrimontana
Ovis aries ophion
Ovis aries vignei
Ozotoceros bezoarticus
Pachycereus militaris
Pachypodium ambongense
Pachypodium baronii
Pachypodium decaryi
Pangasianodon gigas
Pangshura tecta
Pan spp.
Panthera leo persica – Remains listed in Appendix I under this name, but now classified by most authorities as a distinct population of P. l. leo
Panthera onca
Panthera pardus
Panthera tigris
Pantholops hodgsonii
Papasula abbotti
Paphiopedilum spp.
Papilio chikae
Papilio homerus
Pardofelis marmorata
Pediocactus bradyi
Pediocactus knowltonii
Pediocactus paradinei
Pediocactus peeblesianus
Pediocactus sileri
Pelecanus crispus
Pelecyphora spp.
Penelope albipennis
Perameles bougainville
Peristeria elata
Pezoporus occidentalis
Pezoporus wallicus
Pharomachrus mocinno
Phocoena sinus
Phoebastria albatrus
Phragmipedium spp.
Physeter macrocephalus
Picathartes gymnocephalus
Picathartes oreas
Pilgerodendron uviferum
Piliocolobus kirkii
Piliocolobus rufomitratus
Pionopsitta pileata
Pipile jacutinga
Pipile pipile
Pithecophaga jefferyi
Pitta gurneyi
Pitta kochi
Platanista spp.
Platysternidae spp.
Plethobasus cicatricosus
Plethobasus cooperianus
Pleurobema plenum
Podilymbus gigas
Podocarpus parlatorei
Polymita spp.
Polyplectron napoleonis
Pongo abelii
Pongo pygmaeus
 An isolated orangutan population in Indonesia was identified as the separate species P. tapanuliensis in 2017. It presumably is protected in Appendix I as part of either P. abelii or P. pygmaeus.
Potamilus capax
Presbytis potenziani
Primolius couloni
Primolius maracana
Priodontes maximus
Prionailurus bengalensis bengalensis (Only the populations of Bangladesh, India and Thailand; all other populations are included in Appendix II)
Prionailurus planiceps
Prionailurus rubiginosus (Only the population of India; all other populations are included in Appendix II)
Prionodon pardicolor
Pristidae spp.
Probarbus jullieni
Probosciger aterrimus
Psammobates geometricus
Psephotus chrysopterygius
Psephotus dissimilis
Psephotus pulcherrimus
Pseudemydura umbrina
Pseudochelidon sirintarae
Pseudomys fieldi praeconis
Pseudoryx nghetinhensis
Psittacula echo
Psittacus erithacus
Pterocnemia pennata (Except Pterocnemia pennata pennata which is included in Appendix II)
Pteronura brasiliensis
Pteropus insularis
Pteropus loochoensis
Pteropus mariannus
Pteropus molossinus
Pteropus pelewensis
Pteropus pilosus
Pteropus samoensis
Pteropus tonganus
Pteropus ualanus
Pteropus yapensis
Pudu puda
Puma concolor costaricensis
Puma yagouaroundi (Only the populations of Central and North America; all other populations are included in Appendix II)
Pygathrix spp.
Pyrrhura cruentata
Python molurus molurus
Pyxis arachnoides
Pyxis planicauda
Quadrula intermedia
Quadrula sparsa
Renanthera imschootiana
Rheinardia ocellata
Rhinocerotidae spp. (Except the subspecies included in Appendix II)
Rhinopithecus spp.
Rhinoplax vigil
Rhodonessa caryophyllacea
Rhynchopsitta spp.
Rhynochetos jubatus
Rhyticeros subruficollis
Romerolagus diazi
Rucervus duvaucelii
Rucervus eldii
Saguinus bicolor
Saguinus geoffroyi
Saguinus leucopus
Saguinus martinsi
Saguinus oedipus
Saimiri oerstedii
Sanzinia madagascariensis
Sarracenia oreophila
Sarracenia rubra ssp. alabamensis
Sarracenia rubra ssp. jonesii
Sauromalus varius
Saussurea costus
Sclerocactus blainei
Sclerocactus brevihamatus ssp. tobuschii
Sclerocactus brevispinus
Sclerocactus cloverae
Sclerocactus erectocentrus
Sclerocactus glaucus
Sclerocactus mariposensis
Sclerocactus mesae-verdae
Sclerocactus nyensis
Sclerocactus papyracanthus
Sclerocactus pubispinus
Sclerocactus sileri
Sclerocactus wetlandicus
Sclerocactus wrightiae
Scleropages formosus
Scleropages inscriptus
Semnopithecus ajax
Semnopithecus dussumieri
Semnopithecus entellus
Semnopithecus hector
Semnopithecus hypoleucos
Semnopithecus priam
Semnopithecus schistaceus
Shinisaurus crocodilurus
Simias concolor
Sminthopsis longicaudata
Sminthopsis psammophila
Sotalia spp.
Sousa spp.
Speothos venaticus
Spheniscus humboldti
Sphenodon spp.
Stangeria eriopus
Strigops habroptilus
Strombocactus spp.
Struthio camelus (Only the populations of Algeria, Burkina Faso, Cameroon, the Central African Republic, Chad, Mali, Mauritania, Morocco, Niger, Nigeria, Senegal and Sudan, roughly corresponding to the range of S. c. camelus; all other populations are not included in the Appendices)
Sus salvanius
Syrmaticus ellioti
Syrmaticus humiae
Syrmaticus mikado
Tapiridae spp. (Except the species included in Appendix II)
Telmatobius culeus
Terrapene coahuila
Testudo kleinmanni
Tetraogallus caspius
Tetraogallus tibetanus
Tinamus solitarius
Tomistoma schlegelii
Totoaba macdonaldi
Toxolasma cylindrella
Trachypithecus geei
Trachypithecus pileatus
Trachypithecus shortridgei
Tragopan blythii
Tragopan caboti
Tragopan melanocephalus
Tremarctos ornatus
Trichechus inunguis
Trichechus manatus
Trichechus senegalensis
Tringa guttifer
Turbinicarpus spp.
Tyto soumagnei
Uebelmannia spp.
Uncia uncia –  Remains in Appendix I under this name, but now classified as Panthera uncia
Unio nickliniana
Unio tampicoensis tecomatensis
Ursus arctos (Only the populations of Bhutan, China, Mexico, and Mongolia; all other populations are included in Appendix II)
Ursus arctos isabellinus
Ursus thibetanus
Varanus bengalensis
Varanus flavescens
Varanus griseus
Varanus komodoensis
Varanus nebulosus
Vicugna vicugna Except the populations of: Argentina (the populations of the Provinces of Jujuy and Catamarca and the semi-captive populations of the Provinces of Jujuy, Salta, Catamarca, La Rioja and San Juan), Chile (population of the Primera Región), Ecuador (the whole population), Peru (the whole population) and Bolivia (the whole population), which are included in Appendix II) – now classified as Lama vicugna, but remains protected as shown here
Villosa trabalis
Vini ultramarina
Vipera ursinii (Only the population of Europe except the area which formerly constituted the Union of Soviet Socialist Republics; these latter populations are not included in the Appendices)
Vultur gryphus
Xanthopsar flavus
Xeromys myoides
Xipholena atropurpurea
Zamia restrepoi
Zosterops albogularis
Zyzomys pedunculatus

References

External links

 Official CITES website
 Explanation of the Appendices
 Number of species on the Appendices
 Species lists (Appendices I, II and III)

Lists of biota by conservation status
Endangered species
Appendix I